Beka Kavtaradze may refer to:

 Beka Kavtaradze (footballer) (born 1999), Georgian football player
 Beka Kavtaradze (water polo) (born 1990), Georgian water polo player